Alfred Browne (22 February 1860 – 12 September 1940) was a Barbadian cricketer. He played in three first-class matches for the Barbados cricket team from 1883 to 1888.

See also
 List of Barbadian representative cricketers

References

External links
 

1860 births
1940 deaths
Barbadian cricketers
Barbados cricketers
People from Christ Church, Barbados